Hannes Ossian Hyvönen (born August 29, 1975) is a Finnish former professional ice hockey player. He played 42 games in the National Hockey League with the San Jose Sharks and Columbus Blue Jackets between 2002 and 2003, though most of his career, which lasted from 1994 to 2009, was spent in European leagues. Internationally Hyvönen played for the Finnish national team at the 2008 and 2009 World Championships, winning a bronze in 2008.

Playing career 
Hyvönen started out in the Kärpät junior team, and started playing in the SM-liiga with TPS. He was drafted by the San Jose Sharks as their ninth-round pick in the 1999 NHL Entry Draft. After playing on a number of SM-liiga teams, Hyvönen departed to North America for the 2001–02 season, which he mostly spent with the Sharks' AHL affiliate, the former Cleveland Barons. He was next signed by the Florida Panthers, but the Columbus Blue Jackets signed him from the waivers list before the start of the season. Near the end of the 2002–03 NHL season the Blue Jackets loaned Hyvönen to Färjestads BK in the Swedish Elitserien. He started the 2004–05 NHL lockout season with Färjestad, and later transferred to Ilves in the SM-liiga. In 2005 Hyvönen signed with HC Fribourg-Gottéron in the NLA, but although he led the team in scoring by the start of November, his performance was deemed unsatisfactory and he was sold to Jokerit.

In February 2002, Hyvönen received an eight-game suspension for high sticking in the AHL. He also received the most penalty minutes, 189, in the SM-liiga during the 1999–2000 season.

Prior to the 2008–09 season, he signed for Södertälje SK of the Swedish Elite League (SEL), but on November 28 his contract was mutually cancelled and Hyvönen moved to HC Dinamo Minsk of the Kontinental Hockey League (KHL). In the 2010–11 season he played for Rapperswil-Jona Lakers of the National League A (NLA), Traktor Chelyabinsk of the KHL, and HIFK of the SM-liiga.

He signed a 15-game try-out contract with Färjestad of the SEL on September 28, 2011, for a comeback season with the club. His first goal in his comeback with the team was scored in his first game, when he tied a game against Djurgårdens IF 1–1. Djurgården left the game with a 3–2 victory in a shootout.

Career statistics

Regular season and playoffs

International

References

External links
 

1975 births
Living people
Ak Bars Kazan players
Columbus Blue Jackets players
Espoo Blues players
Finnish expatriate ice hockey players in Norway
Finnish expatriate ice hockey players in Russia
Finnish expatriate ice hockey players in Sweden
Finnish expatriate ice hockey players in Switzerland
Finnish expatriate ice hockey players in the United States
Finnish ice hockey right wingers
Färjestad BK players
HC Dinamo Minsk players
HC Fribourg-Gottéron players
HC TPS players
HIFK (ice hockey) players
Ilves players
Jokerit players
Karlskrona HK players
Kongsvinger Knights players
Oulun Kärpät players
San Jose Sharks draft picks
San Jose Sharks players
SC Rapperswil-Jona Lakers players
Södertälje SK players
Sportspeople from Oulu
Traktor Chelyabinsk players